Yalga is an urban locality (a work settlement) under the administrative jurisdiction of Oktyabrsky City District of the city of republic significance of Saransk in the Republic of Mordovia, Russia. As of the 2010 Census, its population was 5,672.

History
Urban-type settlement status was granted to it in 1984.

Administrative and municipal status
Within the framework of administrative divisions, the work settlement of Yalga is incorporated as Yalga Work Settlement, which is subordinated to Oktyabrsky City District of the city of republic significance of Saransk. Within the framework of municipal divisions, Yalga is a part of Saransk Urban Okrug.

References

Notes

Sources

Urban-type settlements in Mordovia
Saransk